Geri Malaj Kola (born 14 October 1989) is an Albanian footballer who plays as a central midfielder for Spanish club Atlético Arteixo.

References

External links

1989 births
Living people
People from Kuçovë
Association football midfielders
Albanian footballers
Albania under-21 international footballers
Deportivo Fabril players
Doxa Katokopias FC players
Atromitos Yeroskipou players
Tercera División players
Cypriot First Division players
Cypriot Second Division players
Albanian expatriate footballers
Albanian expatriate sportspeople in Spain
Expatriate footballers in Spain
Albanian expatriate sportspeople in Cyprus
Expatriate footballers in Cyprus